Bloom Center may refer to:

Bloom Center, Logan County, Ohio
Bloom Center, Wood County, Ohio